The Egyptian Liberal Party (abbreviated PLE) is a political party in Kosovo, representing the Egyptian minority. The party won the reserved seat for Egyptian minority in the Kosovan parliamentary election, 2014, having obtained 1,960 votes (0.27% of the total votes in the election). PLE maintained the same representation in parliament until  the 2021 election, during which it lost its sole seat. PLE was represented in the Assembly of Kosovo by Veton Beriša.

References

Ashkali
Liberal parties in Kosovo
Political parties of minorities in Kosovo